In Greek legendary history, Messene (Ancient Greek: Μεσσήνη) was the daughter of Triopas, king of Argos (or, alternately, daughter of Phorbas and sister of Triopas). She was married to Polycaon, son of king Lelex, of Laconia.

Mythology 
Messene was said to have been very ambitious. After her father-in-law died, her husband's brother Myles inherited the throne to Laconia. It was not her intent to be wed to an anonymous man, so she went about gathering an armed force from both Argos and Laconia. Once their army was ready, the newly married couple invaded a nearby territory. This territory was then named Messenia, after the aggressive princess of Argos. Following the establishment of the new kingdom, they founded the city Andania, where they built their palace. Glaucus, the son of Aepytus and grandson of Cresphontes, established a hero cult of Messene. There was a heroon of her in Messenia with a statue of gold and Parian marble. It is estimated that the story took place in  10th century B.C.

Pausanias remarks that he checked through The Great Ehoiai, Naupactica and the works of Cinaethon and Asius of Samos in search for information concerning children of Polycaon and Messene, but found no relevant information.

Notes

References 

 Pausanias, Description of Greece with an English Translation by W.H.S. Jones, Litt.D., and H.A. Ormerod, M.A., in 4 Volumes. Cambridge, MA, Harvard University Press; London, William Heinemann Ltd. 1918. . Online version at the Perseus Digital Library
 Pausanias, Graeciae Descriptio. 3 vols. Leipzig, Teubner. 1903.  Greek text available at the Perseus Digital Library.

External links
Myth Index - Messene

Greek mythological heroes
Princesses in Greek mythology
Queens in Greek mythology
Inachids
Women in ancient Greek warfare
Laconian mythology
Messenian mythology
10th-century BC women
Ancient Greek queens consort